Goose game may refer to:

Untitled Goose Game, a video game
Game of the Goose, a board game